Igor Anatolyevich Lediakhov (born 22 May 1968) is a Russian football coach and a former player who played as an attacking midfielder.
 
He played for almost a decade in Spain, mainly for Sporting de Gijón (eight years, amassing La Liga totals of 106 games and 17 goals in four seasons), later embarking in a managerial career in his country.

Lediakhov represented the CIS at Euro 1992 and Russia at the 1994 World Cup.

Playing career

Club
Born in Sochi, Russia, Lediakhov started playing professionally with modest FC SKA Rostov-on-Don. In 1990, he joined FC Dnipro Dnipropetrovsk.

After impressing with FC Rotor Volgograd, Lediakhov was bought by Soviet Union giants FC Spartak Moscow, being essential as the capital team conquered three consecutive league titles, which included the inaugural edition of the competition, as the player scored in double digits in two of the three seasons.

In the 1994 summer, 26-year-old Lediakhov moved abroad, signing with Spain's Sporting de Gijón. Even though he netted nearly 50 overall goals for the club (17 in four La Liga seasons) whilst showcasing good offensive skills, his eight-year-old stay in Asturias was an inconsistent one, marred by irregular performances and disciplinary problems: he received a six-match ban after a 22 February 2000 match at Albacete Balompié, after assaulting an opponent then repeatedly pushing referee Téllez Sánchez after receiving his marching orders. At the club, he teamed up with compatriots Dmitri Cheryshev (five seasons), Yuri Nikiforov (two) and Alexei Kosolapov (one).

Lediakhov also spent a few months in Japan (loaned by Sporting and coinciding with Paulo Futre), after which he returned – with the club now in the second level – having further disciplinary problems which led to a suspension. He eventually bought out his contract and retired in 2003 at the age of 35, after one season with SD Eibar also in division two.

International
Lediakhov gained 16 international caps for both the CIS and Russia, which he represented respectively at UEFA Euro 1992 (did not leave the bench) the 1994 FIFA World Cup (played one match, the 6–1 group stage routing of Cameroon).

Coaching career
In 2007, Lediakhov worked as sporting director at FC Rostov. On 6 June of the following year, he was assigned coaching duties at Spartak Moscow's youth teams.

From August to September 2008, Lediakhov served as caretaker manager of the club, later working as assistant under both Michael Laudrup and the Dane's successor, Valery Karpin.

On 22 December 2009, he was appointed head coach of FC Shinnik Yaroslavl, staying in charge for approximately five months. On 9 May 2011, he was announced as new director of football at FC Rotor Volgograd, for which he also acted as scout.

Lediakhov returned for a second spell as Spartak's assistant, on 6 September 2011.

On 7 April 2018, he became the caretaker manager for Russian Premier League's FC Akhmat Grozny following the resignation of Mikhail Galaktionov. On 22 May 2018, he was signed as Akhmat's manager on a permanent basis. He resigned from Akhmat on 2 September 2018.

On 20 September 2018, he signed with FC Baltika Kaliningrad until the end of the 2018–19 season. He was dismissed by Baltika on 19 December 2018.

Statistics

Club

National team

Honours
Russian League: 1992, 1993, 1994
CIS Cup: 1992
Russian Cup: 1994

References

External links
RussiaTeam biography and profile 

1968 births
Living people
Sportspeople from Sochi
Soviet footballers
Russian footballers
Association football midfielders
Soviet Top League players
Soviet First League players
Russian Premier League players
FC SKA Rostov-on-Don players
FC Dnipro players
FC Rotor Volgograd players
FC Spartak Moscow players
La Liga players
Segunda División players
Sporting de Gijón players
SD Eibar footballers
J1 League players
Yokohama Flügels players
Russia international footballers
Dual internationalists (football)
UEFA Euro 1992 players
1994 FIFA World Cup players
Russian expatriate footballers
Expatriate footballers in Spain
Expatriate footballers in Japan
Russian expatriate sportspeople in Spain
Russian football managers
Russian Premier League managers
FC Spartak Moscow managers
FC Shinnik Yaroslavl managers
FC Rotor Volgograd managers
FC Akhmat Grozny managers
FC Baltika Kaliningrad managers
FC Taganrog players